WRIL (106.3 FM) is a radio station  broadcasting a Top 40 music format to Southeast Kentucky, United States, parts of southwest Virginia as well as uppereast Tennessee.  The city of license is Pineville, Kentucky.  The station was put on the air in 1973 by Bell County resident and owner John McPherson. Lester Adkins was a top DJ and sales person and Rick Nelson handled the sports from 1975 until the station went off the air in 2006.

History

The station went on the air as WTJM in 1973. In the 1980s the call letters were changed to WZKO.  On November 1, 1993, the station changed its call sign to the current WRIL. The station adopted a format called Real-Country which matched its new call letters.

At one time WRIL was one of the most powerful stations in southeastern Kentucky. Although only having around 1,000 watts, the station's antenna was on top of the mountain overlooking Pineville, which allowed its signal to reach out into many counties.

December 21, 2008, the station was brought back by Brian O'Brien.  O'Brien has taken control and is broadcasting "The Bigger, Better, Big-Time Morning Show" with news, weather and sports including celebrity interviews.  They also broadcast the "Tradio" show.  "The Big One"  as it is now known, has been declared by the Bell County School Board as "The Voice Of The Bell County Bobcats" and airs their football and basketball games.  The Big One is also covering Bell County, Middlesboro and Pineville games.

References

External links

RIL
Contemporary hit radio stations in the United States